Rayongwittayakom School (RYW), also known informally as Rayongwit (Thai: ระยองวิทย์) is a public secondary school in Rayong, Thailand. It enrolls students from Mathayom 1-6 (grades 7-12).

History 

In 1971, the Thai Ministry of Education combined the Rayongmitobpatump School and the Satreeboonsiribumpeng School to form the new Rayongwittayakom School. In 1971., They allocated teachers and budget for increasing efficiency of management in school.

Rayongwittayakhom School is located on the original area of Rayongmitobpatump School.

Curriculum

Middle school 
 Regular classroom
 English for Integrated Studies (EIS) -teaching Mathematics and Computer Science by English language
 "GIFTED" classroom -focus on Mathematics and Science
 English program (EP)

High school

The Mathematics-Science major 
 Enrichment Science classroom
 Mathematics and Computer Science
 Regular Mathematics and Science
 Mathematics and Science for Preparatory Engineering
 Mathematics and Science by English program (EP) -since 2012

The Arts major 
 Arts-Mathematics
 Arts-Music-Sport
 Arts-Chinese 
 Arts-French
 Arts-Japanese
 Arts-Korean

Extracurricular activities

Sport event 

A major event  is the annual sports festival, an event for which each class building spends months in preparation, and includes competitions not only in athletics but also parade and audience displays. There are 6 colors: yellow, purple, red, green, blue, and pink.

Love and commitment activity 

This activity is held on the last day of instruction for students in Matthayom 6. In the morning, the director will give flowers to students in Matthayom 6 who pass the quota exam of university.

References

External links 
 www.rayongwit.ac.th

Schools in Thailand